The 2021 Arkansas Razorbacks baseball team (variously the Diamond Hogs or the Omahogs) represents the University of Arkansas in the 2021 NCAA Division I baseball season. The Razorbacks are coached by Dave Van Horn, in his 19th season with the Razorbacks, and play their home games at Baum–Walker Stadium.

Preseason

Preseason coaches poll
In the preseason coaches poll, Arkansas was predicted to finish in third place in the West Division. Ole Miss received a majority of the votes to win the West Division, with Mississippi State, Arkansas, and LSU all receiving at least one such vote. Florida was the overwhelming favorite to win the East Division, receiving all but one first-place vote, with the last going to Vanderbilt. The Gators were also the favorites to win the SEC as a whole; they received 12 such votes, while Mississippi State and Vanderbilt received one each.

Preseason team selections
Multiple Razorbacks were named to preseason All-America teams by several organizations and publications. Baseball America named outfielder Christian Franklin and second baseman Robert Moore to its All-America second team, and College Baseball Nation made the same picks, though listed Moore as a shortstop. D1Baseball, Perfect Game, and NCBWA all named Franklin to their first teams. In addition, four Razorbacks – Moore, Franklin, catcher Casey Opitz, and designated hitter Matt Goodheart – were named to the SEC Baseball Coaches preseason All-Conference first team. Both Franklin and Moore were also named to the Golden Spikes Award preseason watchlist by USA Baseball.

Roster

Schedule and results
Arkansas' schedule was released on January 19, 2021. The Razorbacks began their season in Arlington, Texas, with the State Farm College Baseball Showdown. There, they looked to improve on their results from last year, where Arkansas travelled to Houston to play Oklahoma, Texas, and Baylor, losing all three. After wins against Texas Tech, Texas, and TCU, the Hogs opened their home season with a pair of weekend series sweeps against Southeast Missouri State and Murray State before playing their first true road series at Louisiana Tech. The final game against Louisiana Tech was the team's first loss of the season. They would suffer two more in quick succession, however, dropping a midweek home game to Oklahoma and the first of a home weekend series to Alabama, though they would recover to win the last two and take their SEC-opening series. Several days later, Arkansas finished a six-game home stand with a pair of midweek victories over Memphis.

Regular season

February

State Farm College Baseball Showdown

The Razorbacks faced a tough weekend to begin their 2021 campaign, as they travelled to Arlington, Texas to compete in the 2021 State Farm College Baseball Showdown. Ranked No. 8 in the preseason D1Baseball, Coaches, and NCBWA polls, No. 14 by Baseball America, and No. 22 by Collegiate Baseball Newspaper, Arkansas started their season with three games in three days, against three top-10 opponents from the state of Texas. The first of these was Texas Tech, ranked No. 3 in the country. This was the 62nd meeting between the two teams; Arkansas entered leading the all-time series, 46–15. Zebulon Vermillion and Patrick Monteverde started on the mound for the Razorbacks and Red Raiders, respectively, and both pitchers carried their teams through four scoreless innings to begin the game. Both teams scored first in their respective halves of the fifth inning; Arkansas took a 1–0 lead on a bases-loaded walk in the top half of the inning, but Texas Tech responded with five runs of their own by way of three singles and a wild pitch in the bottom half to take a 5–1 lead. Arkansas tied the game in the sixth after Jalen Battles' 2 RBI double, a wild pitch, and a Robert Moore sac fly, though Tech pulled one back to enter the seventh inning up by a single run. Both teams put more runs on the board in the seventh: a balk and a wild pitch sent three runs in for the Razorbacks, and a three-run Braxton Fulford home run did the same for the Red Raiders. Neither team scored in the eighth inning, and Arkansas entered the final frame trailing by one. This deficit did not last long; the Razorbacks plated five runs in the ninth, as a Battles single, Moore walk, a wild pitch, and a 2 RBI single by Braydon Webb made the score 13–9 heading into the bottom of the ninth. As he had done in the previous two frames, Arkansas closer Elijah Trest retired the side, this time with two popups and a strikeout, to end the contest. Trest was awarded a win, while Tech reliever Andrew Devine, who allowed four runs on five hits, was awarded the loss. Caden Monke and Kole Ramage also made appearances on the mound for Arkansas, though they did not record an out, and Kevin Kopps and Ryan Costeiu recorded three each. Vermillion, the starter, was credited with four innings pitched, as he was pulled after facing two batters in the fifth inning, and Trest pitched three full innings after entering in relief of Costeiu in the seventh with nobody out.

The Hogs' second game of the tournament matched them with the No. 9 Texas Longhorns. This game was the 89th between the two teams; Texas entered leading the series, 56–32. The Razorbacks started Peyton Pallette on the mound, while Tristan Stevens got the starting nod for the Longhorns. Like Arkansas' first game, this game got off to a slow start, with neither team scoring in the first three innings; both teams were retired in order with the exception of Texas' half of the third inning, where they left three runners on base and recorded the game's first hit but could not score. Texas went down in order in the top of the fourth, and a single by Cullen Smith in the bottom of that inning put the Razorbacks' first hit on the board. Two batters later, Brady Slavens recorded an RBI and Arkansas' first run with a single that sent Smith home. Caden Monke entered in relief of Pallette in the top of the fifth, and Monke himself was pulled in favor of Caleb Bolden at the beginning of the sixth inning. In the bottom of the sixth, following a Robert Moore groundout, the Hogs got two runners on base by way of a six-pitch walk to Christian Franklin and Cullen Smith being hit with a pitch, prompting Texas to pull Stevens in favor of Dawson Merryman. After striking out the first batter he faced, Merryman gave up a three-run home run to Brady Slavens, which increased Arkansas' lead to four. From that point, Texas managed only two baserunners in the last three innings of the game, while Arkansas had six, though no more runs would come across and the score remained 4–0. Caleb Bolden, credited with 4 innings pitched with no hits given up, was awarded the save; Caden Monke got the win and Texas starter Tristan Stevens was handed the loss. While starter Peyton Pallette did not get a decision, he finished with a career-best eight strikeouts, with the Hogs pitching staff combining for fifteen in what was the first shutout of Texas since 1988.

For their final game in Arlington, the Razorbacks faced the No. 10 TCU Horned Frogs for the 67th time in program history; Arkansas entered leading the series, 47–19. Lael Lockhart, a graduate transfer from Houston, made his debut as the Hogs' starter, while Austin Krob started on the mound for TCU. With the exception of the four-pitch walk dealt to TCU's Tommy Sacco, neither offense managed a baserunner in the first inning, and the Hogs recorded a hit but could not score in the top of the second. The Horned Frogs opened the scoring in the bottom half of that inning, as a pair of singles by Brayden Taylor and Luke Boyers allowed Zach Humphreys, who had been hit by a pitch earlier in the inning, to score. After that, neither team managed anything for several innings, and both teams pulled their starters in the fifth inning; Charles King relieved Krob and Evan Taylor relieved Lockhart. With the score still 1–0 in favor of TCU, Jaxon Wiggins made his Razorback debut when he entered the game for Taylor to begin the bottom of the sixth; he retired his first three batters consecutively on strikeouts. The Razorbacks again made a pitching change to begin the seventh inning, sending Ryan Costeiu out, who, like Wiggins, retired the first three batters he faced. After six scoreless innings, Arkansas found the scoreboard in the seventh, as a Christian Franklin triple drove home Jalen Battles to tie the game. Immediately afterwards, King was pulled and Haylen Green was sent to the mound for TCU, though Cullen Smith singled shortly thereafter to drive home the go-ahead run for the Razorbacks. Closer Kevin Kopps entered the game for the bottom of the eighth, setting down the side in order, and a Casey Opitz double and a Harrison Beethe wild pitch allowed the Hogs to plate two more runs in the top of the ninth and take a 4–1 lead into the final half-inning of the game. Despite two walks, Kopps was able to strike out three batters and end the game, earning the Razorbacks a 3–0 start to the season and a sweep in Arlington. Costeiu was awarded the win and Kopps was credited with a save, while Charles King received the loss. Over the course of the weekend, the Razorbacks were not averse to late-game offense; 19 of their 21 runs in the three games combined came in the sixth inning or later.

Southeast Missouri State weekend series

The Razorbacks opened their 2021 home season at Baum–Walker Stadium in Fayetteville with a four-game weekend series against the Southeast Missouri State Redhawks, who entered with a 2–1 record. These four games would be the 12th–15th in the all-time series, with the Hogs leading 6–5 in previous meetings. The starting pitchers for each team were Dylan Dodd and Caleb Bolden for the Redhawks and Razorbacks, respectively. The game started well for the visitors, as SEMO loaded the bases after the first three batters, and sent home a run after a single by Lincoln Andrews. That prompted a pitching change for the Razorbacks after just four batters, as Patrick Wicklander entered. Inheriting loaded bases, Wicklander forced a fielder's choice that scored the Redhawks' second run, and a steal of home put SEMO up by three after the top of the first. The Hogs, for their part, got two baserunners in their half of the first, but a groundout ended the inning before either could advance past second base. Arkansas scored a run of their own in the bottom of the third when Christian Franklin hit a solo home run to left field, narrowing the deficit to two. Another solo home run in the fourth inning, this time by Brady Slavens, cut the Redhawks' lead to one. Wicklander, having completed 4.1 innings, was pulled in the top of the fifth, with Caden Monke entering and retiring the final two batters of the fifth. Arkansas would leave four runners on base in the fifth and sixth innings combined, and Austin Williams entered to pitch in relief of SEMO starter Dylan Dodd to begin the seventh inning. He would retire three straight Razorback batters, all on groundouts, before the Redhawks scored twice more in the top of the eighth by way of a Danny Wright 2 RBI single. Afterwards, Ryan Costeiu relieved Monke for the Razorbacks and finished the inning; Costeiu himself was replaced by Evan Gray for the ninth inning. Trailing 2–5, Arkansas needed three runs in the final half-inning to avoid a loss in their home opener; a pair of singles set up an RBI for Jalen Battles that brought the game within two. After a pitching change that sent Kyle Miller to the mound, a bases-loaded walk to Franklin and a sac fly from Cullen Smith, tied the game at five. A strikeout followed, sending the game to extras. Closer Jaxon Wiggins was sent to the bump for the Hogs to begin the tenth inning; he retired the first three SEMO batters in order, giving Arkansas an opportunity to win the game in the bottom of the tenth. A double and a walk by Casey Opitz and Cayden Wallace, respectively, prompted a pitching change that brought Blake Cisneros into the game, though he hit his first batter to load the bases. The next batter up, Battles, hit a walk-off single, driving home Opitz to win the game 6–5. Wiggins received the win for the Hogs, while Miller, who allowed the go-ahead run to reach base in the tenth, was handed the loss. With the win, the Razorbacks have now won 27 consecutive home openers in a row, dating back to 1995.

Looking to improve on the previous day's performance, Arkansas started Zebulon Vermillion on the mound, while Southeast Missouri State's Noah Niznik got the start. Like the first game, Southeast Missouri got runners on base early, as the Redhawks left three men on in the first two innings without scoring. On the contrary, the Razorbacks were retired in order in both of the first two innings. Both teams found the scoreboard in their respective halves of the third inning, as SEMO scored two by way of a walk and a pair of singles, while the Razorbacks put up two of their own via a Robert Moore two-run homer. Evan Taylor entered the game to pitch for Arkansas to begin the fourth; he lasted only three batters after two walks and a wild pitch, and was relieved by Connor Noland, who retired the side with a double play. Arkansas went down in order in the bottom of the fourth, as did the Redhawks in the top of the fifth, and, despite Brayden Webb being hit by a pitch and stealing second base shortly thereafter, the Razorbacks were held scoreless in the bottom half of that inning as well. The Hogs got the bats going in the bottom of the sixth inning, as Robert Moore reached on a bunt single and scored after a two-run home run by Cayden Wallace; Arkansas' lead would soon increase to four after a Brady Slavens triple and a Charlie Welch home run, after which SEMO starter Noah Niznik would be pulled in favor of Hunter Ralls. SEMO cut the deficit back to three in the top of the seventh, as Peyton Leeper scored on a Tyler Wilber single. This was undone in the bottom of the eighth, as Christian Franklin homered on just the fourth pitch of the inning, and later that inning the Redhawks would send Joseph Karall to the mound following a single and a hit by pitch. Entering the ninth inning, Arkansas made several positional changes, including the substitution of Kevin Kopps as the new pitcher. Despite allowing a single, Kopps got three outs to end the game and secure Arkansas at least a share of the four-game series with a 7–3 victory. Connor Noland was awarded the win for the Razorbacks, while Niznik was handed the loss. The win gave Arkansas their third straight 5–0 start to a season.

In their third game, the Razorbacks looked to clinch the series, and gave the starting nod to right-hander Peyton Pallette, while Ryan Vogt got the start for Southeast Missouri State. The Arkansas bats got started significantly earlier than in any of the Hogs' previous games this year; the bottom of the first began with a leadoff four-pitch walk, two stolen bases, and a wild pitch that prompted a first inning pitching change, which brought Bryce Grossius to the mound. Grossius, after forcing the second out of the inning on an RBI groundout, issued two additional walks, a single, and a wild pitch, before striking out Matt Gregory to end the inning with a 4–0 score. A 1-2-3 second inning for the Redhawks allowed the Hogs offense to take the field once again, where a leadoff single from Robert Moore was immediately followed by a first-pitch two-run homer by Christian Franklin, his third of the series, bumping the Razorbacks' lead to six. The bottom of the third brought more scoring for Arkansas; following a pitching change that brought Matt Perego to the mound, a Moore RBI single and a wild pitch later in the inning widened the margin to eight. SEMO was retired in order in the fourth, and a Jalen Battles double which scored Cullen Smith put the score at 9–0 heading into the fifth inning. Despite tallying their third hit, SEMO was unable to score, and they brought in their fourth pitcher of the game, Joey Kossine, to start the bottom of the fifth, the first scoreless frame for the Arkansas offense. After tossing five complete innings, Pallette was relieved by Nate Wohlgemuth to begin the top of the sixth, though after two walks, a single, a wild pitch, and a run allowed, he was pulled in favor of Zack Morris, who finished the inning. For the first time in the game, Arkansas was retired in order in the bottom of the sixth, as were the Redhawks in the top of the seventh, with Kole Ramage starting that inning on the mound. Two hits in the seventh for Arkansas proved fruitless, and SEMO managed to cut the deficit to seven with an eighth inning solo home run, off the bat of Andrew Keck. This prompted the Hogs' fourth pitching change of the afternoon, as Matthew Magre was tapped to make his collegiate debut, and, after walking his first batter on four pitches, achieved the final two outs to end the frame. SEMO, for their part, put their fourth pitcher of the night on the mound as well, as Joseph Karall started the eighth, and did not allow a run despite giving up the Hogs' final two hits of the night. In the final inning, Gabriel Starks, also making his first collegiate appearance, came to the mound for Arkansas, and retired the side to end the game, 9–3, and clinch the series for the Razorbacks. Both starters earned their respective decisions; Pallette with the win and Vogt with the loss.

Looking to complete the season-opening series sweep, Arkansas and Southeast Missouri State met for a fourth and final time on Sunday afternoon in Fayetteville. With left-hander Lael Lockhart starting on the mound for Arkansas and right-hander Austin Williams starting on the mound for the Redhawks, the game got underway with three straight outs by both teams. SEMO achieved the game's first hit in the top of the second by way of a Lincoln Andrews single, though a 5-4-3 double play ended the inning one batter later. Arkansas established their offense early yet again, as Cayden Wallace and Brady Slavens hit solo home runs to lead off the bottom of the second and establish a 2–0 lead for the Razorbacks. A Casey Opitz double and a Jalen Battles RBI single several batters later increased the lead to three, and was the end of the afternoon for Williams as Connery O'Donnell came in to relieve him after 1.2 innings. The Redhawks found the scoreboard late in their ensuing inning, as Peyton Leeper's groundout scored Jevon Mason to make it 3–1. In the bottom of the third, Arkansas got runs across on consecutive batters as Cullen Smith's double scored Slavens and an error by O'Donnell allowed Smith to advance to third and score himself, making the score 5–1. SEMO kept up the offense in their half of the fourth inning, as Andrew Keck and Mason got onboard and were driven home by a single from Ty Stauss, which prompted Arkansas's first pitching change of the afternoon, a switch to Caden Monke. Monke's day did not last long though, as he walked his first two batters on 12 pitches combined and was then pulled himself in favor of Kevin Kopps. SEMO replaced their pitcher to start the fourth as well; Hunter Ralls entered and allowed the first five batters of the inning to reach base: Robert Moore on a double, Christian Franklin on an error that scored Moore, Matt Goodheart on a two-run home run, and Wallace and Slavens on doubles. Later in the inning, Arkansas increased the lead further; Bates and Battles plated runs on consecutive RBI base hits, making the score 11–3 in the Razorbacks' favor. A leadoff home run from Austin Blazevic in the top of the fifth inning narrowed the margin to seven, but three consecutive outs to follow kept the score at 11–4. A rain delay in the middle of the fifth led to the game being called then (as the game was official after the conclusion of the top of the fifth), and Arkansas completed the sweep of Southeast Missouri State with Kopps earning the win and Williams receiving the loss.

March

Murray State weekend series

To begin the month of March, the newly-ranked No. 1 Razorbacks played host to the Murray State Racers in a three-game weekend series. Having met twice before, in a two-game series in 1986, the first game of the series began on the evening of March 5, 2021. Left-hander Shane Burns got the starting nod for the visiting Racers, while right-hander Peyton Pallette started the series for the Razorbacks. Murray State started the game with a 1-2-3 inning on offense, and the Hogs were the first to record a hit with Robert Moore's leadoff single in the bottom of the first. The Hogs got a second baserunner after Christian Franklin was delivered a four-pitch walk, but both of those runners were left stranded when the inning ended. The Racers were the first on the scoreboard, as a double by Ryan Perkins sent Tanner Booth home and established a 1–0 lead for the visitors in the top of the third. The Razorbacks responded in their half of the inning, with two leadoff walks and a Cayden Wallace sacrifice fly tying the contest at 1. Arkansas took the lead two batters later, as Casey Opitz's triple drove home two runs and gave Arkansas a 3–1 lead. An RBI single by Jake Slunder in the top of the fourth inning brought the deficit to one run, and the Racers continued their scoring in the top of the fifth. With Connor Noland entering to pitch for Arkansas, a one-out single followed by a two-run homer from Brock Anderson gave the Racers the lead, and Noland was pulled himself in favor of Zack Morris. Morris's first batter was Trey Woosley, who homered on the seventh pitch of the at bat and extended the Racer lead to three runs. Both offenses were relatively quiet from then until the bottom of the sixth inning, when Robert Moore's home run scored himself and Jalen Battles and made it a one-run game again. The Hogs threatened again in the bottom of the seventh, but stranded runners on second and third and were unable to capitalize. Ryan Costeiu entered the game to pitch the eighth inning for Arkansas, and walked two batters before being replaced in favor of Kevin Kopps. A wild pitch and a walk loaded the bases for the Racers, though a strikeout ended the inning and ensured the Racers' lead remained at one. Arkansas took the lead shortly thereafter, as Zack Gregory walked and Robert Moore hit his second home run of the game, putting Arkansas ahead 7–6. Jaxon Wiggins entered the game to pitch the ninth inning for Arkansas, and finished the game with a 1-2-3 inning, earning his first save of the year in the process. Kopps was awarded the win, and Alec Whaley got the loss for Murray State.

Louisiana Tech weekend series

Oklahoma midweek game

Alabama weekend series

Memphis midweek series

Mississippi State weekend series

Record vs. conference opponents

Rankings

2021 MLB draft

Trest did not sign with the Rockies and returned to Arkansas.

Awards

Postseason awards
Upon the conclusion of the conference season, the SEC handed out its postseason awards and named its all-conference teams for 2021. Right-handed pitcher Kevin Kopps was named the SEC Pitcher of the Year, the second Arkansas player to earn that honor, and head coach Dave Van Horn was named the SEC Coach of the Year for the second time. Kopps, alongside second baseman Robert Moore and designated hitter Matt Goodheart were named first team all-SEC players, with center fielder Christian Franklin and pitcher Patrick Wicklander making the all-SEC second team. Infielder Cayden Wallace was one of thirteen SEC players named to the all-conference freshman team, and a further two Razorbacks - Robert Moore and pitcher Peyton Pallette - made the newcomer all-SEC team. Three Razorbacks were named to the all-SEC defensive team: Christian Franklin, Robert Moore, and Kevin Kopps. On June 3, 2021, Kopps was named the National Player of the Year by the Collegiate Baseball Newspaper. He is the first reliever to ever be awarded that honor. On June 18, 2021, Kopps won the 34th annual Dick Howser Trophy, bestowed annually to the national college baseball player of the year. Kopps is the second player in Arkansas baseball history to win the Howser Trophy, along with Andrew Benintendi in 2015. The Howser Trophy is considered to be the Heisman Trophy of college baseball. On June 28, 2021, Kopps was named the D1Baseball.com National Player of the Year. On July 15, 2021, Kopps was named the winner of the 43rd annual Golden Spikes Award, given annually to the best amateur baseball player in the United States. He is the second Arkansas player to win this award after Benintendi in 2015.

See also
2021 Arkansas Razorbacks softball team

References

Arkansas
Arkansas Razorbacks baseball seasons
Arkansas Razorbacks baseball
Arkansas